SOI or soi or variation may refer to:

Technology
 Silicon on insulator, in semiconductor manufacturing
 Signal operating instructions
 Service-oriented infrastructure
 Stages of involvement for safety-critical software and hardware, US FAA

Science
 Southern Oscillation Index
 Sphere of influence (astrodynamics)
 Second-order intercept point, a measure of linearity that quantifies second-order distortion generated by nonlinear systems and devices

Soi
 A soi is a side-street branching off a major street in Thailand.
 Soi (surname), a surname
 Soi language, an Iranian language
 Chua Soi Lek (born 1947), Malaysian politician

Other uses
 Sociosexual Orientation Inventory
 School of Infantry
 Severity of illness
 Sphere of influence,  in politics
 Symphony Orchestra of India
 Stars on Ice, a skating tour
 Statistics of Income of the US Internal Revenue Service
 Shadow of Israphel, a Minecraft series by The Yogscast

See also

 
 
 
 
 Pou-Soi
 Soy (disambiguation)
 SOJ (disambiguation)
 Soja (disambiguation)
 Soya (disambiguation)
 Soia (disambiguation)